Pedro Álvaro Rodríguez Rosero (born 18 October 1966) is a retired Ecuadorian road cyclist, who was a professional from 1992 to 1995. Nicknamed "El Aguila de Tulcán", he competed for his native South American country at the 1996 Summer Olympics in Atlanta, Georgia in the men's road race, alongside Héctor Chiles and Paulo Caicedo.

Major results

1988
 1st Overall Vuelta al Ecuador
1990
 1st Overall Vuelta al Ecuador
1991
 1st Overall Vuelta al Ecuador
1993
 1st Overall Vuelta al Ecuador
 7th Overall Vuelta a Colombia
1994
 1st Stage 7 Clásico RCN
 7th Overall Vuelta a Colombia
1995
 1st Overall Vuelta al Ecuador
 1st Overall Vuelta a Mendoza
 1st Prologue & Stage 5 Vuelta a Colombia
 3rd Overall Clásico RCN

References
 
 sports-reference

1966 births
Living people
People from Tulcán
Ecuadorian male cyclists
Vuelta a Colombia stage winners
Olympic cyclists of Ecuador
Cyclists at the 1996 Summer Olympics